Maquiztzin was the daughter of the Aztec Tlatoque (ruler) Huehue Quetzalmacatzin and Tlacocihuatzin Ilama, in 15th-century Mesoamerica.

She married Tenochcan Tlacaelel and moved to Tenochtitlan with him. She had five children. Her eldest son was Cacamatzin. One of other children was the great warrior Tlilpotoncatzin. The last child was Princess Xiuhpopocatzin. It is unknown where she went.

She was a grandmother of Tlacaelel II, and an ancestor of Leonor Moctezuma and María Moctezuma.

Notes

Tenochca nobility
15th-century women
15th-century indigenous people of the Americas
Nobility of the Americas